Pat Howard (born 1973) is an Australian coach and former rugby union international

Pat or Patrick Howard may also refer to:
 Pat Howard (diver) (born 1938), Australian female diver
 Pat Howard (footballer) (born 1947), English football player
 Patrick Howard (rugby union) (born 1992), South African rugby union player
 Patrick J. Howard, city clerk of Chicago